Silvia Salgado Cavazos (born February 9, 1978) is a Mexican model and beauty pageant titleholder who won the national pageant Nuestra Belleza México and represented her country and placed among the semi-finalists in the 1999 Miss Universe pageant, held in Chaguaramas, Trinidad and Tobago, on May 26, 1999.

References

1970s births
Beauty pageant contestants from Monterrey
Living people
Miss Universe 1999 contestants
Nuestra Belleza México winners